was a Japanese animator. He is referred to as one of the "fathers" of anime.

Works
Hanawa Hekonai Meitō no Maki, or The Dull Sword (1917)
Chamebō Kūkijūno Maki (1917)
Hanawa Hekonai Kappa Matsuri (1917)
Eiga Enzetsu Seiji no Rinrika Gotō Shinpei (1926)
Chonkire Hebi (1930)

References

External links

Jun'ichi Kōuchi at the National Film Archive of Japan

Japanese animators
Anime directors
Japanese animated film directors
Japanese animated film producers
1886 births
1970 deaths